Beltrame Feragut or Bertrand d'Avignon (Avignon  1385c. 1450) was a French composer. He was one of several French composers who worked in Italy; at Florence and Vicenza. Bertrand was either a priest or monk, since that was then a requirement to become maestro di cappella at Milan Cathedral (1426–1430).

Recordings
Francorum nobilitati – Ensemble Perlaro, PAN, 2010

References

1380s births
1450s deaths
French composers
French classical composers
French male classical composers
Renaissance composers